Karposh may refer to:


People
Karposh, rebel leader killed by Ottomans in 1689 after leading an uprising.
Hristijan Todorovski Karpoš, a Macedonian partisan who participated in the National Liberation War of Macedonia.

Places
Karpoš Municipality of Skopje
Karposh Point is the ice-free point on the north coast of Snow Island in the South Shetland Islands, Antarctica.

Product identification
Karposh, the codename for Tilix 2.0, a Bulgarian Linux distribution.

Other uses
Karposh’s Rebellion, a military uprising headed by Karposh against members of the Ottoman Empire.